The Rock This Country Tour was the third concert tour by Canadian recording artist Shania Twain. The tour was Twain's first tour in eleven years and was billed as her farewell tour. The tour kicked off on June 5, 2015, in Seattle, and concluded in Kelowna on October 27, 2015. The trek preceded the release of Twain's fifth studio album. At the end of 2015, the tour placed 19th on Pollstar's "2015 Year-End Top 100 Worldwide Tours" list, grossing $69 million from 72 shows with a total attendance of 703,148.

Background
On March 4, 2015, while appearing on Good Morning America, Twain announced the tour as well as her upcoming album. Since this is her last tour, Twain said that she wants to go out on bang and she's "ready to hang my hat up in that regard", which is touring. Twain also shared that this going to "be a real, kickin' hard-hitting, fun party show". Due to popular demand, nineteen additional dates were added in May 2015, forming the second North American leg.

In July 2015, Twain's agent said it was very likely an international leg of the tour would take place in the spring and summer of 2016.

On August 24, 2015, Shania Twain announced in an interview that she is not ready to give up touring and that "She's decided that a 2-year return residency to Las Vegas is back in her plans."

Concert synopsis
After a video introduction, Twain emerges onstage atop a rising platform in thigh-high leather boots, a red, sequined mini-dress and a black leather jacket singing "Rock This Country!" From there, Twain continues the opening portion of the show with "Honey, I'm Home" and "You Win My Love", number one country radio hits from 1998 and 1996, respectively, before launching into a punchy take on her first radio hit, "Whose Bed Have Your Boots Been Under?" After a chat with the audience, Twain keeps the show in full country mode with "I Ain't No Quitter", her 1997 five-week number one hit "Love Gets Me Every Time", and the fan favorite "Don't Be Stupid (You Know I Love You)".

After making her way through the audience during "Any Man of Mine", Twain disappears for a costume change while her seven-member band provides an interlude of her 2003 international hit "Ka-Ching!". Accompanied by a flurry of pyrotechnics, Twain reappears on stage in a black leather, body-hugging ensemble for "I'm Gonna Getcha Good!"
After the breezy "Come On Over" and opening act accompanied duet of "Party for Two", Twain takes a moment to chat with the audience about the voice struggles she has had in recent years and how she thought she "would never sing again" and that it is a "miracle" she made it back onstage. Exclaiming that "there's no way but up from here", Twain ascends into the air on a saddle that takes her in a long, slow circle above the audience as she sings "Up!".

Once back onstage, Twain and her band begin an acoustic set, beginning with her most recent single at the time, 2011's "Today Is Your Day" and the infectious and light "No One Needs to Know". Twain is then left alone on center stage, and sings two of her biggest hits, 1998's multi-platinum and Grammy award-winning "You're Still the One", and "From This Moment On". The "From This Moment On" performance is considered the highlight of the nearly two-hour concert. Returning in thigh-high red leather boots and an oversized black shawl, Twain closes out the main portion of the show with the one-two punch of "That Don't Impress Me Much" and "(If You're Not in It for Love) I'm Outta Here!". She returns in a half-body catsuit for the fiery, firework filled finale of "Man! I Feel Like A Woman!".

Opening Acts 

 Wes Mack (Seattle, select Canadian dates)
 Gavin DeGraw (United States, select Canadian dates)

Setlist
This set list is representative of the show on July 25, 2015, at The Palace of Auburn Hills in Auburn Hills, Michigan. It is not representative of all concerts for the duration of the tour.

 "Rock This Country!"
 "Honey, I'm Home"
 "You Win My Love"
 "Whose Bed Have Your Boots Been Under?"
 "I Ain't No Quitter"
 "Love Gets Me Every Time"
 "Don't Be Stupid (You Know I Love You)"
 "Any Man of Mine"
 "I'm Gonna Getcha Good!"
 "Come On Over" 
 "Party for Two" 
 "Up!"
 "Today Is Your Day"
 "No One Needs to Know"
 "You're Still the One"
 "From This Moment On"
 "That Don't Impress Me Much"
 "(If You're Not in It for Love) I'm Outta Here!"
Encore
"Video Sequence/Red Storm"
"Man! I Feel Like a Woman!"

Shows

Cancelled shows

References

2015 concert tours
Shania Twain concert tours